Joseph Comber (26 February 1911 – 3 May 1976) was an English cricketer. He played 57 first-class matches for Cambridge University Cricket Club between 1931 and 1948.

See also
 List of Cambridge University Cricket Club players

References

External links
 

1911 births
1976 deaths
English cricketers
Cambridge University cricketers
Place of birth missing
Marylebone Cricket Club cricketers
Gentlemen cricketers
Free Foresters cricketers
Cambridgeshire cricketers
H. D. G. Leveson Gower's XI cricketers